SIG SAUER AG is a Swiss manufacturer of armaments. The company was previously registered as SAN Swiss Arms AG and changed its name to SIG SAUER AG in December 2019. It was known as SIG Arms AG before 2000 when it was acquired by the German investors Michael Lüke and Thomas Ortmeier from parent company Schweizerische Industrie Gesellschaft.  The company is now part of L&O Holding, which also owns the German-based SIG SAUER GmbH & Co.KG and the US-based SIG SAUER Inc.

History
The SIG "Schweizerische Industrie Gesellschaft" was founded as "Schweizerische Waggon-Fabrik bei Schaffhausen". Production of arms started in 1860 at the request of the Swiss Army. Between 1970 and 1975, SIG purchased Swiss-based Hämmerli AG as well as the German-based Hämmerli in Tiengen and SAUER & SOHN GmbH in Eckernförde. In 2000, SIG sold the small arms division to the Lüke & Ortmeier Group and the company became SAN Swiss Arms AG. The Castelli-Moser family from Zürich owns a small part of the company.

In 2020, the company changed its name to SIG SAUER AG.

Products

 Rifles
 SG 550 line of assault rifles (also includes the SG 551, SG 552 Commando carbines, the SG 553 and various semi-automatic sporting variants). The SG 550 is the standard service rifle of the Swiss Armed Forces and has been exported to several other countries in limited numbers.
SAN 511

 Pistols
 SIG Sauer SP 2022 (non-blowback, polymer variant) 

Grenade launchers
 GLG 40 and GL 5040/5140

Pellet rifles
TG-1

See also

References

External links
www.sigsauer.swiss/en — official site

Firearm manufacturers of Switzerland
Lüke & Ortmeier Gruppe
Neuhausen am Rheinfall
SIG Sauer